The Thomas Alleyne Academy is an Academy in Stevenage, Hertfordshire, England. It was founded in 2013, but can trace its roots back to 1558,  when the original school was set up from the will of Thomas Alleyne.

It is situated at the northern end of Stevenage High Street, in Stevenage Old Town, adjacent to the roundabout of the A1072 and the A602 (former A1), and more than 200 metres to the east of the East Coast Main Line.

The Academy has 180 in each year group and is a popular school, with Year 7 places usually oversubscribed. The school was inspected by Ofsted in October 2019 and retained a 'Good' rating.

In 2017 the school converted all lighting to LED; a project funded by The Educational Social Enterprise Fund for LED Lighting. In the same year the school moved their heating system from gas to Biomass fuel. The biomass system is fuelled with wood pellets obtained from sustainable forests.  In the summer of 2020 the 1950s science block was completely renovated using a Capital Improvement Fund government grant, upgrading the outdated 1950s labs to state of the art new facilities.

In 2021, the school changed its mission from "Where success is expected, achieved and celebrated" to "Achieving excellence through personal growth". It also swapped its five core values (Create & Succeed, Aim High, Take Pride, Show Respect and Be Safe) for three new ones - Courage, Determination and Empathy.

Francis Cammaerts (1916–2006), French Resistance leader and witness in the Lady Chatterley's Lover Trial, was headmaster from 1952 to 1961. Francis Cammaerts was the author Michael Morpurgo's uncle. Morpurgo wrote a fictional story based on his uncle's experiences in WWII ‘In the Mouth of the Wolf’.

In 1969 the school became a comprehensive, Alleyne's School. In 1989 it merged with Stevenage Girls' School and changed to its current name. During the summer of 2012, Thomas Alleyne's was chosen to choose a torchbearer to run with the torch for the 2012 Summer Olympics.

The Vincent motorcycle factory was based in the current Thomas Alleyne Academy reception between 1928 and 1955. There is a plaque on the reception building commemorating the Vincent motorcycle champion George Brown

The current head teacher at the Thomas Alleyne Academy is Mr Mark Lewis. Mark Lewis is also the Managing Director of the Hart Schools Trust, a Multi-Academy Trust incorporating Roebuck Academy in Stevenage.

Academy Status
In March 2013, the School (as it was then known) requested to turn into an Academy.

On Sunday 1 September 2013, Alleynes became an Academy, with links to North Hertfordshire College. Being an Academy means that Alleynes has more control over finances and their curriculum, which they wouldn't have if they had stayed as a 'School'. This means that the Academy is now funded directly by central government and not the Local Authority.

Notable former pupils

Alleyne's Grammar School
 Sir Henry Chauncy, historian
 Geoffrey Howard, grandson of Sir Ebenezer Howard, pioneer of garden cities
 Harry Bates, 1850 to 1899, one of the finest English artists of the nineteenth century 
Ken Hensley 1956-1961, of the rock band Uriah Heep

Alleyne's School
 Graham Poll, referee

Notable former Staff
 Roger Luxton (OBE) principal adviser and finally director of children's services at Barking and Dagenham, former school governor
Tony McWalter MP for Hemel Hemstead from 1997 till 2005. Worked at the school from 2005 till 2019
 Francis Cammaerts (Headmaster) Special Operations Executive Agent during World War II

See also
 Alleyne's Academy
 Thomas Alleyne's High School

References

External links
 The Thomas Alleyne Academy
 Ofsted Inspection Report
 Old Alleynians
 Get Information About Schools (gov.uk)
 Thomas Alleyne Supporters Association (TASA)

News items
 https://www.thecomet.net/news/education/stevenage-s-thomas-alleyne-school-and-airbus-flying-challenge-5425308
Stevenage students off to a flying start with Airbus mentoring scheme (Oct 2019)
http://www.thecomet.net/news/gcse_results_thomas_alleyne_stevenage_1_1491162
Student from the Thomas Alleyne School carries Olympic Torch through Stevenage Old Town 
 http://www.106jack.com/news/local-news/olympic-torch-relay-meet-hertfordshires-torchbearers/
MP Praises Thomas Alleyne students on a school charity day to raise money to "Send my friend to school"  
 http://www.theadvertisergroup.co.uk/Education-and-Training/MP-praises-pupils-support-of-poor-African-students-18072012.htm

1558 establishments in England
Educational institutions established in the 1550s
Secondary schools in Hertfordshire
Academies in Hertfordshire
Schools in Stevenage
Grade II listed educational buildings
Grade II listed buildings in Hertfordshire